The 2016 LA Galaxy season was the club's twenty-first season of existence, their twenty-first in Major League Soccer and their twenty-first consecutive season in the top flight of American soccer.

The Galaxy finished the MLS regular season third in the Western Conference, but were knocked out by the Colorado Rapids in the Conference Semifinals of the 2016 MLS Cup Playoffs. They also continued their campaign in the 2015–16 CONCACAF Champions League, reaching the quarterfinals before losing to Santos Laguna. The team also reached the semifinals of the U.S. Open Cup before being knocked out by FC Dallas.

On September 8, Landon Donovan came out of retirement and signed with the Galaxy, his former club.

Players

Squad information 

Players at the end of the season.

Transfers

Transfers in

Transfers out

Competitions

Preseason 
The first preseason match was announced on November 23, 2015.

Major League Soccer

Standings

Overall

Western Conference

Regular season

Playoffs

Knockout round

Conference semifinals

U.S. Open Cup

Fourth round

Fifth round

Quarterfinal

Semifinal

CONCACAF Champions League

Quarterfinals

See also 
 2016 in American soccer
 2016 LA Galaxy II season

References

External links 
 

LA Galaxy seasons
La Galaxy
La Galaxy
LA Galaxy
2016 in Los Angeles